Gull Island (Cree language: Kee-Yah-Sh-Koh Mah-Nah-Woo-Na-N) is one of the many uninhabited islands in Qikiqtaaluk Region, Nunavut, Canada. It is a Canadian arctic island located within the midsection of James Bay, south of Vieux Comptoir, Quebec (Old Factory, Quebec).

Though it is small and grassy, it has sufficient vegetation to sustain a large seagull colony.

References

Islands of James Bay
Uninhabited islands of Qikiqtaaluk Region